80 may refer to: 

 80 (number)
 one of the years 80 BC, AD 80, 1980, 2080
 B. B. King & Friends: 80
 80 (Tolis Voskopoulos album), 1980
 Audi 80, a precursor of the Audi A4 automobile
 Boeing 80, a late 1920s Boeing aircraft
 "80", a song by Green Day from their 1991 album Kerplunk!

See also
 
 List of highways numbered